The Mid-States Rodeo Association (MSRA) is an American semi-professional rodeo association that sanctions events in Michigan, Illinois, Indiana, Ohio, Pennsylvania, West Virginia and Kentucky. The MSRA is headquartered in Riga, Michigan. It is not to be confused with the identically named Mid-States Rodeo Association which sanctions events in Minnesota, Iowa, South Dakota, Nebraska and Kansas.

MSRA Events
Calf roping
Barrel racing
Breakaway roping
Saddle bronc riding
Bareback bronc riding
Bull riding
Steer wrestling
Team roping

External links
Official Website
Rodeo Entries

Rodeo organizations
Sports in Michigan
Culture of Lansing, Michigan